David Zuckerman may refer to:

David Zuckerman (politician) (born 1971), Lieutenant Governor of Vermont
David Zuckerman (computer scientist), professor of computer science, University of Texas at Austin
David Zuckerman (TV producer) (born 1962), American television producer and writer

See also
David Zucker (disambiguation)